Giannina Marchini (18 January 1906 in Florence – 1976) was an Italian sprinter and middle distance runner.

Achievements

National titles
Giannina Marchini has won two times the individual national championship.
1 win in  400 metres (1928)
1 win in  Cross country running (1929)

See also
 Italy national relay team

References

External links
 

1906 births
1976 deaths
Sportspeople from Florence
Italian female sprinters
Italian female middle-distance runners
Athletes (track and field) at the 1928 Summer Olympics
Olympic athletes of Italy
Olympic female sprinters